Hudec (feminine Hudcová) is a Czech and Slovak surname. Notable people with the surname include:

 Alois Hudec (1908–1997), Czech gymnast
 Frank Hudec, American drummer
 Jan Hudec (born 1981), Czech alpine skier
 Jiří Hudec (born 1964), Czech hurdler
 Jiří Hudec (composer) (1923–1996), Czech composer, conductor and organist
 László Hudec, Hungarian-Slovak architect active in Shanghai
 Martin Hudec (born 1982), Czech footballer
 Martin Hudec (rally driver), Czech rally driver
 Martina Hudcová, Czech beach volleyball player
 Stanislav Hudec, Slovak ice hockey player

See also
 
15399 Hudec, main-belt asteroid
Majel Barrett (born Hudec)

Czech-language surnames
Slovak-language surnames